The Emeishan Traps constitute a flood basalt volcanic province, or large igneous province, in south-western China, centred in Sichuan province. It is sometimes referred to as the Permian Emeishan Large Igneous Province or Emeishan Flood Basalts. Like other volcanic provinces or "traps", the Emeishan Traps are multiple layers of igneous rock laid down by large mantle plume volcanic eruptions. The Emeishan Traps eruptions were serious enough to have global ecological and paleontological impact.

It is named for Emeishan, a mountain in Sichuan.

Etymology
The term "trap" has been used in geology since 1785–1795 for such rock formations. It is derived from the Swedish word for stairs ("trappa") and refers to the step-like hills forming the landscape of the region.

Formation and development
The eruptions that produced the Emeishan Traps began 265 million years ago (Ma) or earlier. The main eruptive period is between 262 and 261 Ma, and the volcanism activities end 259 Ma.

In volume, the Emeishan Traps are dwarfed by the massive Siberian Traps, which occurred, in terms of the geological time scale, not long after, at approximately 252 Ma. The Emeishan basalts covers an area of more than 250,000 km2 with thicknesses ranging from several hundred meters up to 5.5 km (the average flood basalt thickness throughout the entire region is estimated to be around 700 m), but the Emeishan traps may have initially covered an area as much as 500,000 km2. Thus the entire volume of the Emeishan basalts is estimated to be 300,000 km3. Evidence suggests that the initial volcanism of the central Emeishan Traps occurred in a deep submarine environment without any significant prevolcanic uplift.

The Emeishan Traps are associated with the end-Capitanian mass extinction event, the extinction of animal and plant life that occurred at the end of the Capitanian stage of the Guadalupian epoch of the Permian period. Limestone within the traps show the extinction to occur immediately below the first eruptive unit, with the mass extinction marked at the onset of explosive Emeishan volcanism. The formation of volcaniclastics suggest violent phreatomagmatic-style eruptions. The synchrony between the Emeishan Traps and the end-Guadalupian extinction has been taken to support the argument of Vincent Courtillot and others that volcanism is the main driver of mass extinctions.

See also
 Deccan Traps
 Viluy Traps
 List of flood basalt provinces
 Siberian Traps

References
Citations

Bibliography
 
 
 
 Koeberl, Christian, and Francisca C. Martinez-Ruiz, eds. (2003) Impact Markers in the Stratigraphic Record. New York, Springer-Verlag.
 Yuen, David A., Shinegoru Maruyama, Shun-Ichiro Karato, and Brian F. Windley, eds. (2007) Superplumes: Beyond Plate Tectonics. New York, Springer-Verlag.

External links
 Age of the Emeishan Flood Magmatism and Relations to Permian-Triassic Boundary Events.
 Nature - "Re-evaluating plume-induced uplift in the Emeishan large igneous province"
 Science - "Volcanism, Mass Extinction, and Carbon Isotope Fluctuations in the Middle Permian of China"

Large igneous provinces
Permian volcanism
Geography of Sichuan
Volcanism of China